"The Royal Welch Fusiliers" is a march composed by John Philip Sousa in 1929, and then rewritten in 1930. It is the only march written by Sousa for a  British Army regiment.

In 1900 the 2nd Battalion of the Royal Welch Fusiliers was part of the multinational force that lifted the Siege of the International Legations during the Boxer Rebellion; during this action they served alongside elements of the United States Marine Corps' 1st Marine Regiment. In 1929, at the request of surviving Marine veterans who had served at Peking, the then 75-year-old Sousa composed a tribute march to the British regiment, eponymously titled "The Royal Welch Fusiliers". Commandant of the Marine Corps Wendell Cushing Neville, a veteran of Peking, was dissatisfied with Sousa's first attempt, and a second version of the march was completed by Sousa the following year.

The march was debuted at the White House in the spring of 1930 at the annual dinner of the Gridiron Club of Washington for President of the United States Herbert Hoover who was, himself, one of the westerners besieged in Peking thirty years prior. The following summer, Sousa traveled to Tidworth, England, where on June 25 a "beautifully bound score of the march" was presented to the fusiliers during the regiment's anniversary observance of the battle. Sousa also directed the band of the Royal Welch Fusiliers in the performance of his march.

The original score of "The Royal Welch Fusiliers" is at the Museum of the Royal Welch Fusiliers in Caernarfon, Wales.

See also 
 List of marches by John Philip Sousa

References

External links
 Image of Sousa directing the Royal Welch Fusiliers

Sousa marches
1930 compositions
Compositions by John Philip Sousa
British military marches
Royal Welch Fusiliers